Wilhelm Karl Friedrich Fitzenhagen (15 September 1848 – 14 February 1890) was a German cellist, composer and teacher, best known today as the dedicatee of Pyotr Ilyich Tchaikovsky's Variations on a Rococo Theme.

Life
Fitzenhagen was born in Seesen in the Duchy of Brunswick, where his father served as music director. Beginning at age five, he received lessons on the piano, the cello and the violin. Many times, he had to substitute for wind players absent due to various emergencies. At age 14, Fitzenhagen began advanced studies of the cello with Theodore Müller. Three years later, Fitzenhagen played for the Duke of Brunswick, who released him from all military service. In 1867, some noble patrons enabled him to study for a year with Friedrich Grützmacher in Dresden, A year later he was appointed to the Dresden Hofkapelle, where he started his career as soloist.

Fitzenhagen's playing at the 1870 Beethoven Festival in Weimar attracted the attention of Franz Liszt, who had formerly served as music director there. Liszt attempted to talk Fitzenhagen into joining the court orchestra. Fitzenhagen, however, had already accepted a professorship at the Moscow Conservatory. Fitzenhagen became regarded as the premier cello instructor in Russia and equally well known as a soloist and chamber music performer. He was appointed solo cellist to the Russian Musical Society and director of the Moscow Music and Orchestral Union. It was through this union that he made many concert appearances as a soloist. He formed a friendship with Tchaikovsky, giving the first performances of all three of that composer's string quartets as well as the Piano Trio as a member of the Russian Music Society's quartet.

Fitzenhagen trained a number of excellent cellists, including Joseph Adamowski, who went to America in 1889 to join the newly formed Boston Symphony Orchestra and helped found the orchestra's pension program. Adamowski also formed a string quartet named after him and taught at the New England Conservatory in Boston.

Fitzenhagen died in Moscow.

Fitzenhagen and the Rococo Variations
Fitzenhagen gave the first performance of Tchaikovsky's Variations on a Rococo Theme, which was dedicated to him, on 30 November 1877. The composer had already allowed his soloist a great deal of freedom in modifying the solo part, but Fitzenhagen chose additionally to alter the sequence of variations, possibly for the opportunity of soloistic display. The D minor variation which had been third in Tchaikovsky's original order was switched with the seventh and an eighth variation dropped altogether. Fitzenhagen may have felt justified by these efforts by the audience reaction after a performance at the Wiesbaden Festival in June 1879, writing to Tchaikovsky, "I produced a furore with your variations. I pleased so greatly that I was recalled three times, and after the Andante variation (D minor) there was stormy applause. [Composer Franz] Liszt said to me, 'You carried me away! You played splendidly', and regarding your piece he observed: 'Now there, at least, is real music'."

How seriously Tchaikovsky may have viewed Fitzenhagen's more radical alterations is difficult to say. After the cello and piano arrangement appeared in Fitzenhagen's ordering of variations in 1878, Tchaikovsky complained to his publisher P. Jurgenson that Fitzenhagen had proofread the piece badly. Later, however, he may have come to regret Fitzenhagen's license with the piece more negatively. When cellist Anatoliy Brandukov approached Tchaikovsky just before the full score was published in 1889, he found the composer "very upset, looking as though he was ill. When I asked: 'What's the matter with you?' Pyotr Ilyich, pointing to the writing table, said: 'That idiot Fitzenhagen's been here. Look what he's done to my piece — he's altered everything!' When I asked what action he was going to take concerning this composition, Pyotr Ilyich replied: 'The devil take it! Let it stand as it is!'"

Fitzenhagen's 1878 order was retained and the work became part of the standard repertoire. The variations are still played in Fitzenhagen's sequence to the present day, despite the subsequent discovery and restoration of the composer's original order.

Selected compositions
Fitzenhagen wrote more than 60 works for the cello. These include four concertos, a suite for cello and orchestra, a string quartet and numerous salon pieces. He won an award from the St. Petersburg Chamber Musical Union for his string quartet. However, few of these works have survived.

 Op. 1 – Romance
 Op. 2 – Concerto for Cello and Orchestra No. 1, in B minor
 Op. 3 – Two Songs Without Words for Cello and Piano
 Op. 4 – Concerto Fantastique, for Cello and Orchestra No. 2, in A minor
 Op. 5 – Tarantella
 Op. 6 – Nocturne, for Piano and Harp
 Op. 7 – Wiegenlied, for 4 cellos
 Op. 8 – Resignation, Sacred Song Without Words, for Cello and Organ or Piano, in E-flat major. Also for 4 cellos, in F major.
 Op. 10 – Ballad, for Cello and Orchestra or Piano
 Op. 13 – Impromptu
 Op. 14 – Concert Mazurka
 Op. 15 – Consolation, for Cello and Organ or Piano
 Op. 16 – Three Easy Pieces, for Cello
 Op. 20 – Two Morceaux de Salon, for Cello
 Op. 21 – Elegy
 Op. 22 – Three Small Pieces for a Young Cellist
 Op. 23 – String Quartet in D minor
 Op. 24 – Perpetual Motion Machine for Cello and Piano
 Op. 25 – Light Variations in G major on an Original Theme for Cello and Orchestra
Arrangement 1: for piano, Breitkopf (Edition Breitkopf No. 3280)
Arrangement 2: for piano, edited by G. Bostrem (Г. Бострема)
 Op. 26 – Album Leaf
 Op. 27 – Three Morceaux de Salon, for Cello
 Op. 28 – 40 Exercises & Technical Studies for the Cello
 Op. 29 – Three Easy Pieces in the First Position
 Op. 31 – Concert Waltzes for Four Cellos
 Op. 32 – Funeral March
 Op. 33 – Variations on a Rococo Theme for Cello and Orchestra, by Tchaikovsky; heavily edited by Fitzenhagen
 Op. 34 – Fantasy on Motifs from the Opera "The Demon" by Anton Rubinstein
 Op. 35 – Serenade, for Solo Cello, in G major
 Op. 36 – Gavotte, in A major
 Op. 40 – Capriccio
 Op. 41 – Ave Maria for Four Cellos
 Op. 42 – Gavotte No. 2 for Cello and Piano
 Op. 43 – Impromptu
 Op. 44 – Nocturne
 Op. 45 – Minuet
 Op. 59 – The Spinnerin for Four Cellos
 Op. 62 – Suite for Cello, Orchestra, and Piano
 Op. 63 – Concerto for Cello and Orchestra No. 3, in A minor

Discography
 Wilhelm Fitzenhagen: Cello Concerto No. 2; Various pieces for cello and piano.
 Wilhelm Fitzenhagen. Cello concertos Nos. 1 & 2. Includes also Ballade Op. 10, Resignation Op. 8 and Tchaikovsky's Variations on a Rococo Theme.

References

Bibliography
 Brown, David, Tchaikovsky: The Crisis Years, 1874-1878 (New York and London: W.W. Norton & Company, 1983),.
 Brown, David, Tchaikovsky: The Final Years, 1885-1893, (New York: W.W. Norton & Company, 1991), .
 Campbell, Margaret, The Great Cellists (North Pomfret, Vermont: Trafalgar Square Publishing, 1988),  .
 MacGregor, Lynda, ed. Stanley Sadie, "Fitzenhagen, (Karl Friedrich) Wilhelm", in The New Grove Dictionary of Music and Musicians, Second Edition, 29 vols (London: Macmillan, 2001), .

External links

1848 births
1890 deaths
19th-century classical composers
19th-century German composers
German classical cellists
German music educators
German Romantic composers
People from Seesen
People from the Duchy of Brunswick
Pyotr Ilyich Tchaikovsky